Joseph Deng (born 7 July 1998) is an Australian middle-distance runner. In July 2018, he broke the 800m Australian record with a time of 1:44.21, which had stood since the 1968 Mexico Olympics.

Biography
Deng was born in Kakuma, Kenya where a UNHCR refugee camp was established in 1969. His mother NYIGOK deng ajak left Sudan to escape the Second Sudanese Civil War.  In 2004, his family moved to Toowoomba, Queensland when he was six and in 2010 he moved to Ipswich at the age of 12. He first attended Raceview State School and then Ipswich Grammar School. In an interview, Deng said that "he identifies himself as Sudanese, he identifies himself as Australian."

Athletics career
Whilst at Raceview State School he was encouraged to attend after-school athletics coaching at Ipswich Grammar School under the guidance of coach Di Sheppard. He was granted a scholarship at Ipswich Grammar School and continued to be coached by Sheppard. His uncle John Deng also played a role in his development.

At the age of 17, he was selected in the Australian team for the 2016 IAAF World U20 Championships. He finished third in the 800 m semi-final in 1:48.49 but failed to qualify for the final. Later in 2016, he ran a personal best of 1:46.51. In 2016, he moved to Melbourne to be coached by Justin Rinaldi who coached Alexander Rowe to run 1:44.40, equalling Ralph Doubell's Australian record.

In 2018, he was controversially selected to compete in 800 m at the 2018 Commonwealth Games, Gold Coast, Queensland after not qualifying for the final at the Australian Athletics Championships. But in the B final he ran a personal best of 1:45.71 and was subsequently selected. At the Games, he finished seventh in the 800m final in  1:47.20. On 20 July 2018, at the IAAF Diamond League meeting in Monaco he finished seventh in the 800m but broke the Australian record with a time of 1:44.21. The previous Australian record of 1:44.40 was set by Ralph Doubell in winning the gold medal at altitude at the 1968 Mexico Olympics and equalled in 2014 by Alexander Rowe in Monaco. Deng's record also broke New Zealander Peter Snell's Oceania record of 1:44.3 that was set in Christchurch in 1962. At the end of the 2018 season, Deng had run four times under 1.45 in the year, the most ever by an Australian.

Deng has also been credited with his ability to run sprint distances. He boasts a 47.25 over the 400m and a wind-aided 22.24 200m.

Following the political controversy surrounding purported "African crime gangs" in Melbourne, Deng was cited by the ABC as "a track star of boundless potential" and "proof positive of what immigrants can offer to their adopted country when given the opportunity."

References

External links
 
 Joseph Deng at Athletics Australia
 
 Joseph Deng at Australian Athletics Historical Results
 

1998 births
Living people
Australian male middle-distance runners
Athletes (track and field) at the 2018 Commonwealth Games
Commonwealth Games competitors for Australia
Australian people of South Sudanese descent
Sportspeople of South Sudanese descent
South Sudanese refugees
Sudanese refugees